Waterloo: The History of Four Days, Three Armies and Three Battles is a history book written by Bernard Cornwell, first published in Great Britain by William Collins on 11 September 2014, and by Harper Collins Publishers on 5 May 2015 in the United States. It is Cornwell's first work of nonfiction, after publishing more than forty novels in the historical fiction genre, including the popular Richard Sharpe series taking place during the Napoleonic Wars.  The book recounts the Battle of Waterloo on 18 June 1815, including preceding events from the campaign of the same name and The Hundred Days.

According to the book's jacket, the book was commissioned to commemorate the Battle's 200th anniversary.

The book includes a number of full colour illustrations, including maps and colour portraits of the major figures involved, including Napoleon Bonaparte, the Duke of Wellington, Field Marshall Prince von Blucher, Marshalls Ney, Soult and Grouchy.

The book should not be confused with Cornwell's novel Sharpe's Waterloo, originally published as Waterloo in 1990.  That novel also narrates the battle, but largely from the perspective of Cornwell's fictional characters.

Foreword 
In his foreword, Cornwell acknowledges that there is already an extensive library of work on the Battle of Waterloo, but one of his reasons for writing the book is to attempt to narrate the battle from the perspectives of the "ordinary" soldiers who participated in it.

Why another book on Waterloo? It is a good question.  There is no shortage of accounts of the battle, indeed it is one of the most studied and written-about battles in history... Yet the Duke of Wellington was surely right when he said that a man might as well tell the history of a ball, meaning a dance, as write the story of a battle.  Everyone who attends a ball has a different memory of the event, some happy, some disappointing, and how, in the swirl of music and ball gowns and flirtations could anyone hope to make a coherent account of exactly what happened and when and to whom?
...
There is an agreed story.  Napoleon attacks Wellington's right in an attempt to draw the Duke's reserves to that part of the battlefield, then launches a massive attack on the Duke's left.  That attack fails. Act Two is the great cavalry assault on the Duke's centre-right, and Act Three, as the Prussians arrive stage left, is the desperate last assault by the undefeated Imperial Guard.  To those can be added the subplots of the assaults on Hougoumont and the fall of La Haie Sainte.  As a framework that has some merit, but the battle was far more complicated than that simple story suggests.  To the men who were present it did not seem simple, or explicable, and one reason to write this book is to try and give an impression of what it was like to be on that field on that confusing day.".

To that end, Cornwell's narrative is intercut with excerpts from letters and memoirs written by soldiers of all ranks, in all three of the participating armies (French, Anglo-Dutch, and Prussian).  These first-person narratives come not only from the high commanders, such as Napoleon, Wellington, and Field Marshall von Blücher, but also Franz Lieber, Karl von Clausewitz, Cavalie Mercer, Louis Canler, Frederick Cavendish Ponsonby, the Reverend William Leeke, and many others.

Audiobook 
Waterloo was released as an audiobook by Harper Audio on 5 May 2015.  The Foreword, Preface, Aftermath and Afterword are read by Cornwell, and Chapters One through Twelve by Dugald Bruce Lockhart.

References 

Works by Bernard Cornwell
2014 non-fiction books
Works about the Battle of Waterloo
Napoleonic Wars books
HarperCollins books